WAP Binary XML (WBXML) is a binary representation of XML. It was developed by the WAP Forum and since 2002 is maintained by the Open Mobile Alliance as a standard to allow XML documents to be transmitted in a compact manner over mobile networks and proposed as an addition to the World Wide Web Consortium's Wireless Application Protocol family of standards. The MIME media type application/vnd.wap.wbxml has been defined for documents that use WBXML.

WBXML is used by a number of mobile phones. Usage includes Exchange ActiveSync for synchronizing device settings, address book, calendar, notes and emails, SyncML for transmitting address book and calendar data, Wireless Markup Language, Wireless Village, OMA DRM for its rights language and Over-the-air programming for sending network settings to a phone.

See also
 Extensible Binary Meta Language
 Compiled Wireless Markup Language
 XML
 Binary XML
 BSON (Binary JSON)
 Efficient XML Interchange

External links
WBXML v1.3 
 Note made available at W3C
 WBXML Library
 Java XML Parser (Pull) and "basic" support for WBXML
 Java StAX implementation for the WBXML

Open Mobile Alliance standards
Internet protocols